Düzqışlaq, Ağamalıoğlu (?-2018) (also, Agamalyoglu) is a village and municipality in the Goranboy Rayon of Azerbaijan.  It has a population of 2,551.

References 

Populated places in Goranboy District